Desiree Coleman  aka Kadesh (From, Jamaica, Queens, New York, United States) is an American vocalist and actress. She was the leading actress in Chloe Kane, a feature film directed by Farzam Salami. Coleman is also the founder of Love Culture Center in Los Angeles, California. Coleman is the ex-wife of former professional basketball player and former head coach of the NBA's Golden State Warriors, Mark Jackson. Coleman came on the scene replacing Tisha Campbell in the longest running Off-Broadway musical production of Mama, I Want to Sing!, in 1983.

Coleman discovered her ability to sing at the age of six. Desiree's mother on hearing her daughter's voice encouraged her to join the St. Luke Baptist Church choir in Queens, New York. During her growing years, she did several commercials and by age fourteen became a part of a community choir called the Soul Searchers of New York City.

In 2006, Coleman recorded a song with WWE called, "Holla", which later became the entrance music for WWE Diva, Kelly Kelly.

Discography 
 1988 – Desiree

References

External links
 

1966 births
Living people
20th-century American actresses
Actresses from New York City
American sopranos
Motown artists
American soul singers
American gospel singers
People from Queens, New York
21st-century American women singers
21st-century American singers